Jerry Anthony Keeble (born August 19, 1963) is a former American football linebacker who played one season for the San Francisco 49ers. He went to college at Minnesota.

References

Living people
1963 births
American football linebackers
Minnesota Golden Gophers football players
San Francisco 49ers players
Players of American football from St. Louis